New Hope High School is a historic public school building located at New Hope, Augusta County, Virginia. It was built in 1925, and is a brick building consisting of an auditorium/gymnasium as the core of the building with rectangular flat roofed blocks on either side. The central auditorium/gymnasium has a tall hipped roof. It has Art Deco style stepped facades on the front and sides, embellished with diamond-shaped concrete blocks along the cornice.  A three-room north wing was added in 1942.  Also on the property is a contributing brick agriculture building built in 1926.

It was listed on the National Register of Historic Places in 1985.

References

School buildings on the National Register of Historic Places in Virginia
Art Deco architecture in Virginia
School buildings completed in 1925
Schools in Augusta County, Virginia
National Register of Historic Places in Augusta County, Virginia
1925 establishments in Virginia